Justin Oien (born May 5, 1995) is an American cyclist, currently riding for UCI Continental team .

Major results

2012
 4th Overall Tour de l'Abitibi
2013
 8th Overall Tour de l'Abitibi
 10th Paris–Roubaix Juniors
2014
 8th ZLM Tour
2016
 1st Stage 1 (TTT) Olympia's Tour
 6th Paris–Roubaix Espoirs
2017
 1st Stage 4 Rhône-Alpes Isère Tour
 4th Grote Prijs Marcel Kint
2018
 9th Clássica da Arrábida

References

External links

1995 births
Living people
American male cyclists